Yuchi is a Chinese compound surname which originated from Xianbei and Khotan. The imperial family name of the Kingdom of Khotan Viśa was translated as Yuchi. There is no consensus on whether the two Yuchi are related.

The well known military general Yuchi Gong was descended from the Xianbei Yuchi.

Yuchi is the 419th surname in Hundred Family Surnames. Since compound surnames are not common in China, some descendants of Yuchi changed their name to single surname Yu or Chi (遲).

Notable Yuchi

Xianbei
 Yuchi Chifan, concubine of Emperor Xuan of Northern Zhou
 Yuchi Gong, military general in Tang Dynasty
 Yuchi Jiong, general of Western Wei and Northern Zhou

Khotan
 Yuchi Sengwubo, king of Khotan
 Yuchi Yiseng, painter from the Kingdom of Khotan

Chinese-language surnames
Individual Chinese surnames